This is a list of heads of the Posavina Canton.

Heads of the Posavina Canton (1996–present)

Governors

Prime Ministers

External links
 World Statesmen - Posavina Canton

Posavina Canton